Zinzi Clemmons is an American writer. She is known for her 2017 debut novel What We Lose.

Personal life
Born in 1985 to a multi-ethnic South African mother from an upper-middle-class family in Johannesburg and African-American father raised in Jamaica, Queens, Zinzi Clemmons grew up in Swarthmore, Pennsylvania and spent summers in South Africa. Rapper Phife Dawg, of the group A Tribe Called Quest, was her cousin.

Clemmons attended Brown University as an undergraduate, studying critical theory, then earned an MFA in fiction at Columbia University, where she worked with Paul Beatty. In 2012 she moved home and paused the novel she was working on to care for her mother who was dying of cancer. She began keeping a diary of the experience, which later served as some of the source material for her first novel.

Clemmons is married to poet and translator André Naffis-Sahely. They live in Culver City, near Los Angeles.

Career
While still at Columbia, Clemmons founded Apogee, an online magazine focused on art engaged with issues of identity.

Clemmons' debut novel What We Lose was published by Viking in 2017. The book was loosely based on Clemmons' own experience being the primary caregiver for her mother when she died of cancer, and was described by The Guardian as "highly experimental, told in intimate vignettes including blogposts, photos, hand-drawn charts and hip-hop lyrics". It received broad critical acclaim, with Vogue calling What We Lose the best debut novel of the year. Writing in The New Yorker, Doreen St. Félix situated the book as part of the literary canon of the black diaspora, noting its thematic emphasis on haunting.

In 2017, the National Book Foundation named Clemmons to its annual "5 under 35" list, selected by Angela Flournoy. The same year, she announced she would no longer write for the Lenny Letter and asked other women of color to join her after Lenny's founder Lena Dunham issued a statement defending coworker Murray Miller, who had been accused of rape by Aurora Perrineau, a biracial actress.

In May 2018, Clemmons accused the writer Junot Diaz of sexual harassment at a workshop when she was a graduate student, following a confrontation with Díaz at the Sydney Writers' Festival. Díaz later denied the allegations. The public response sparked some controversy among feminist academics regarding how race and ethnicity affects the handling of sexual harassment allegations in the context of the Me Too movement. After an investigation, it was determined that Díaz kissed her on her cheek.

Awards

Publications 

 What We Lose (2017)
 Well-Read Black Girl: Finding Our Stories, Discovering Ourselves, edited by Glory Edim (2018)

References

External links

Living people
21st-century American women writers
Writers from Pennsylvania
American women novelists
21st-century American novelists
American people of South African descent
Brown University alumni
1985 births
African-American novelists
21st-century African-American women writers
21st-century African-American writers
20th-century African-American people
20th-century African-American women